414 Tank Battalion is a mixed German and Dutch tank battalion, consisting of  around 100 Dutch and 300 German soldiers.

History

The battalion was founded in 2016, and became fully operational in 2019.

Previously the German battalion, part of the 41st Panzergrenadier Brigade was active from 1991–2006 at Spechtberg. It was established on the basis of the 22nd and 23rd Panzer Regiments, 9th Panzer Division, of the Land Forces of the National People's Army, the former East German Army.

On 17 March 2016, the battalion was attached to the Dutch 43rd Mechanized Brigade which is in turn a part of the German 1st Panzer Division.

The barracks of 414 Panzerbattalion are in Bergen-Lohheide, Lower Saxony.

It has been described as a step towards a "European army".

Structure
414 Tank Battalion consists of the following elements:
 Staff (German, few Dutch)
 1st staff company (staff and supply, mostly German, few Dutch)
 2nd tank company (German)
 3rd tank company (German)
 4th tank company (Dutch - from Regiment Huzaren Prinses Catharina-Amalia)
 5th tank company (German, reserve)

Out of the 100 Dutch soldiers, 72 are tank crew. The other 28 are staff members, maintenance and support crew.

Commander since 2022 is Luitenant-kolonel (Oberstleutnant) Sebastiaan Schillemans (NL)

Equipment 

The battalion's main armament is the Leopard 2 A6MA2  main battle tank. The unit has 49 tanks of these upgraded MBT's. The tank is modified with a Dutch battlefield management system. This is done anticipating the fact that 414 Tank Battalion has joined the Very High Readiness Joint Task Force (VJTF) of the NATO Response Force in 2019.

References

Armoured units and formations of Germany
Army units and formations of the Netherlands
Multinational army units and formations
Germany–Netherlands military relations
Military units and formations established in 2016